Broken Head is a coastal feature (promontory/headland) and suburb located in the Northern Rivers region of New South Wales, Australia, approximately 9 km south of Cape Byron, the easternmost point of Australia, the closest town being Byron Bay. Immediately adjacent is the  Broken Head Nature Reserve which contains an intact segment of littoral rainforest. The suburb of Broken Head contained a population of 225 at the 2011 national census, and in addition supports some tourist accommodation and a campsite. The area is noted for its Aboriginal culture, rainforest walks, whale watching and fishing from pristine beaches, and it is also highly regarded as a surfing locality. The Broken Head Holiday Park is currently administered by the indigenous Arakwal people, having been passed to their control by the New South Wales Crown Lands Department in 2009.

References 

Northern Rivers
Byron Bay, New South Wales
Byron